HMS Southampton was a member of the first group of five ships of the  of light cruisers. She was built by John Brown & Company, Clydebank, Scotland and launched on 10 March 1936.

Service history
Southampton saw service in World War II, and initially served as the flagship of the 2nd Cruiser Squadron with the Home Fleet. On 5 September 1939 she intercepted the German merchant Johannes Molkenbuhr off Stadtlandet, Norway, but her crew scuttled the ship before she could be captured. The crew was taken off by the destroyer , and Johannes Molkenbuhr was then finished off by destroyer .

Southampton was later damaged on 16 October 1939 whilst lying at anchor off Rosyth, Scotland, when she was struck by a 500 kg bomb in a German air raid.  The bomb was released from only  height by a Ju 88 of I/KG.30, and hit the corner of the pom-pom magazine, passed through three decks at an angle and exited the hull, detonating in the water. There was minor structural damage and temporary failure of electrical systems.  She was repaired and at the end of the year she was one of the ships involved in the hunt for the German battleships  and  after the sinking of the armed merchant cruiser . She then served with the Humber Force until February 1940, and then went to the 18th Cruiser squadron at Scapa Flow. On 9 April 1940, Southampton was operating off the Norwegian coast when she sustained splinter damage in a German air attack. The main battery director was temporarily knocked out. After being repaired, she had anti-invasion duties on the south-coast of England until she returned to Scapa Flow in October.

On 15 November Southampton sailed for the Mediterranean. She participated in the action off Cape Spartivento on 27 November. In December the cruiser was moved to the Red Sea to escort troop convoys, and at the same time took part in the bombardment of Kismayu during the campaign in Italian East Africa. On 1 January 1941 she joined the 3rd Cruiser Squadron and took part in Operation Excess. In the early afternoon of 11 January, both she and fellow cruiser  came under attack from 12 Stuka dive bombers of II Gruppe, Sturzkampfgeschwader 2, Luftwaffe. She was hit by at least two bombs south-east of Malta and caught fire; the resulting blaze spread from stem to stern and trapped a number of men below decks. 81 men were killed with the survivors being picked up by Gloucester and the destroyer . Heavily damaged and without power, Southampton was sunk by one torpedo from Gloucester and four from the cruiser .

A week after the sinking Admiral Cunningham, Commander-in-Chief of the Mediterranean Fleet, wrote a private letter to the First Sea Lord, Sir Dudley Pound, "I don't like these 'Southampton' class. They are fine ships but that great hangar structure seems to provide a good point of aim, they are always being hit there." Despite this concern, the other four ships in the Southampton sub-class served through the entire war, and only two of the ten overall Town class ships were lost due to air attack (two others were lost to torpedo attack).

Notes

References

 
 
 
 
 
 
 
 

 

Town-class cruisers (1936)
Ships built on the River Clyde
1936 ships
World War II cruisers of the United Kingdom
Cruisers sunk by aircraft
World War II shipwrecks in the Mediterranean Sea
Maritime incidents in January 1941
Ships sunk by German aircraft